Mode for Mabes is an album by tenor saxophonist Eric Alexander. It was recorded in 1997 and released by Delmark Records.

Recording and music
The album was recorded in May 1997. The sextet contains tenor saxophonist Eric Alexander, trumpeter Jim Rotondi, trombonist Steve Davis, pianist Harold Mabern, bassist John Webber, and drummer George Fludas.

Release and reception

Mode for Mabes was released by Delmark Records. The AllMusic reviewer described it as "modern mainstream post-to-hard bop at its finest".

Track listing
"Mode for Mabes" – 8:39	
"Sugar Ray" – 8:02 	
"For Heaven's Sake" – 10:07
"Erik the Red" – 8:49
"Love Thy Neighbor" – 8:33
"Stay Straight" – 6:16
"Stairway to the Stars" – 8:40
"Naima" – 11:17

Personnel
Eric Alexander – tenor saxophone
Jim Rotondi – trumpet
Steve Davis – trombone
Harold Mabern – piano
John Webber – bass
George Fludas – drums

References

1997 albums
Delmark Records albums
Eric Alexander (jazz saxophonist) albums